Nafe Singh Rathee is an Indian Politician and State President for the Indian National Lok Dal political party. He was member of 9th and 10th Haryana Legislative Assembly from the Bahadurgarh constituency.
He was also two term Chairman of Bahadurgarh Municipal Council. He is President of All India Indian Style wrestling Association.

References 

Year of birth missing (living people)
Living people
Indian National Lok Dal politicians
Haryana MLAs 1996–2000
Haryana MLAs 2000–2005
Samata Party politicians